Homborsund Lighthouse is a coastal lighthouse located on the island Store Grønningen in the municipality of Grimstad in Agder county, Norway. It was established in 1879, and is listed as a protected cultural site. Homborsund Lighthouse was constructed the same year as Lyngør Lighthouse, and the two stations have similar designs. The station includes a livinghouse for two families, outhouse, boathouse and pier, in addition to the light. The light was automated in 1992, and the station was de-populated. Today it is open to the public for overnight stays and guidance. The surrounding area is a protected bird sanctuary.

The 3rd order Fresnel lens on top emits a continuous white light with four brighter flashes every 60 seconds. The light has an intensity of 58,500 candela, but during the brighter flashes, the light reaches an intensity of 423,900 candela.

See also

Lighthouses in Norway
List of lighthouses in Norway

References

External links
 Norsk Fyrhistorisk Forening 

Lighthouses completed in 1879
Lighthouses in Agder
Listed lighthouses in Norway
Grimstad